Cautethia grotei, or Grote's sphinx, is a moth of the family Sphingidae. It was described by Henry Edwards in 1882.

Distribution 
It resides in the US state of Florida and the islands of the Caribbean.

Description 
The wingspan is 28–40 mm.

Biology 
There are multiple generations per year in Florida. Adults nectar at various flowers, including Asystasia gangetica and Dracaena fragrans.

Host plants
Larvae have been recorded feeding on various Rubiaceae species, including milkberry (Chiococca alba), black torch (Erithalis fruticosa) and common snowberry (Symphoricarpos albus).

Subspecies
Cautethia grotei grotei (Florida, Cuba, the Bahamas, Cayman Islands and possibly Hispaniola and Jamaica. Strays have been found up to Tennessee, Illinois, Pennsylvania, New York and even New Hampshire)
Cautethia grotei apira Jordan, 1940 (Cayman Islands)
Cautethia grotei hilaris Jordan, 1940 (Cayman Islands)

References

External links
"Grote's sphinx Cautethia grotei Hy. Edwards, 1882". Butterflies and Moths of North America. Retrieved January 12, 2018.
"Cautethia grotei grotei". Sphingidae of the Americas.

Cautethia
Moths described in 1882